Zhanjiao Futou (展角幞頭), lit. "spread-horn head cover", was the headwear of Song dynasty officials. It consisted of a black hat with two wing-like flaps. The thin flaps were stiff and straight, and could extend up to almost a meter each.

It is rumoured that the founder of the Song dynasty, Emperor Taizu of Song, designed this hat so that during assemblies his officials would be kept apart by the flaps and would not whisper to each other.

It was also later adapted by the Ming dynasty, authorized for court wear.

See also

Qing official headwear
Futou
Chuijiao Putou
List of hats and headgear
Hanfu

References

Headwear
Chinese headgear